The Houziyan Dam is a hydroelectric embankment dam on the Dadu River in Danba County, Sichuan province, China. 

The dam is 223.5 m tall and withholds a reservoir with a normal capacity of 662 million m3. It supports a power station with a 1,700 MW capacity, distributed in 4 x 425 MW generators.

History
The feasibility report for the project was completed in May 2006 and by July of that same year, the project application was granted. Construction on the dam was initially planned to start in 2007, but the groundbreaking ceremony actually took place in 2011. The project was completed in 2016.

See also 

 List of power stations in China

References

Hydroelectric power stations in Sichuan
Dams in China
Dams on the Dadu River